Cryptanthus lacerdae is a plant species in the genus Cryptanthus. This species is endemic to Brazil.

Cultivars
 Cryptanthus 'Icy'
 Cryptanthus 'Mars'
 Cryptanthus 'Menescal'
 Cryptanthus 'Osyanus'
 Cryptanthus Stirling Silver
 Cryptanthus 'Zebra'
 xNeotanthus 'Tom Montgomery'

References

BSI Cultivar Registry Retrieved 11 October 2009

lacerdae
Flora of Brazil